Michael Lutener Laws (born 12 August 1926) is an English former cricketer who played eight games of first-class cricket, mostly  for Middlesex, between 1946 and 1950. He was born in Finchley and attended Highgate School. An amateur cricketer, he played as a wicketkeeper.

References

External links
 
 

1926 births
Possibly living people
People educated at Highgate School
English cricketers
Middlesex cricketers
Marylebone Cricket Club cricketers
Combined Services cricketers
People from Finchley